Timber is a 1942 drama film directed by Christy Cabanne. Its plot concerns the obstruction of lumber-mill production for Canada's Department of National Defence during World War II.

Plot 
Jules Fabian heads a gang of saboteurs determined to subvert the Canadian Forestry Corps. Quebec, Arizona and Kansas, three men who begin work at a lumber company, uncover the plot. Kansas, who in reality is working undercover for the corps, romances Yvette Lacour.

Cast
Leo Carrillo as Quebec
Andy Devine as Arizona
Dan Dailey as Alan Kansas
Marjorie Lord as Yvette Lacour
Wade Boteler as Dan Crowley
Edmund MacDonald as Pierre Lacour
Nestor Paiva as Jules Fabian

References

External links
 
 
 
 

1942 films
1942 drama films
American black-and-white films
Films directed by Christy Cabanne
American drama films
Films set in forests
Films about lumberjacks
1940s English-language films
1940s American films